Hugo A. Berkhout (born 9 April 1974) is a Dutch currency specialist and politician. He has been a member of the Senate since October 2020. There, he represented the conservative and right-wing populist party Forum for Democracy until he stepped out of the party the following month amidst an internal crisis. He later joined the splinter party JA21.

Non-political career 
Berkhout was born in the Gelderland village of Beesd and studied at an Amsterdam university. He subsequently worked for Delta Lloyd Bank as a fixed income manager and FX trader. Beside his job, he served as treasurer of the Dutch chapter of the industry body ACI Financial Markets Association and as head of the treasury committee of the self-regulatory organization Dutch Securities Institute, both in the years 2011–19.

Between February 2017 and March 2019, he was ALM/liquidity/FX trade director at Amsterdam Trade Bank, a subsidiary of Alfa-Bank. Thereafter, he moved to the Cypriot municipality Strovolos to lead the treasury and financial institutions department of financial technology company iSignthis at their operations center. In November 2020, he took a job as partner investments and treasury services at Kylla Corporate Transactions in Amsterdam.

Politics 
A member of Forum for Democracy, Berkhout was on an advisory council to select candidates for the 2017 general election and also was on the party list himself (place 21). During the 2018 Amsterdam municipal election, he appeared on place eleven on the party list, but he did not receive a seat. Berkhout was appointed  in the Amsterdam municipal council by his party in June 2018. He was on the finances and economic affairs committee and continued to serve in that position until April 2019.

Berkhout was placed sixteenth on the party list of Forum for Democracy in the 2019 Senate election. His party won twelve seats, and Berkhout was elected because he received eight preferential votes. However, Berkhout declined the seat. All of his votes came from the Forum for Democracy members of the States of North Holland. Broadcasting station NH reported that they probably voted for him to prevent the fifteenth candidate, Robert Baljeu, from being elected, as he had been expelled from the party.

Senator (2020–present) 
When Senator Annabel Nanninga went on parental leave in 2020, Berkhout was installed as temporary senator on 26 October. A crisis broke out within Forum for Democracy in late November, when newspaper Het Parool published an article about extremist messages in WhatsApp groups of the party's youth organization. On 27 November, fellow Forum for Democracy Senator Bob van Pareren posted a statement on Twitter on behalf of himself and three other senators including Berkhout, in which they announced that they would leave the party. They said they did not want to be part of "a party that does not distance itself from racism, antisemitism, and Nazism and that does not listen to criticism". Berkhout officially left the Forum for Democracy caucus on 29 November and joined Fractie-Van Pareren (renamed Fractie-Nanninga in February 2021). He also became the treasurer of his caucus.

Berkhout became a permanent senator – as opposed to a temporary senator – on 15 December 2020, replacing Paul Cliteur, who had resigned due to the crisis at Forum for Democracy. Fractie-Van Pareren announced on 24 December that they would join the new party JA21, that had been founded by two politicians who had left Forum for Democracy.

Parliamentary committees 
While a temporary senator:
 Committee for Immigration and Asylum/Justice and Home Affairs Council
 Committee for Infrastructure, Water Management, and Environment
 Committee for Kingdom Relations
 Committee for Education, Culture, and Science

While a permanent senator:
 Committee for Economic Affairs and Climate Policy/Agriculture, Nature and Food Quality
 Committee for Finances
 Committee for Kingdom Relations
 Committee for Social Affairs and Employment

Personal life 
He lives in The Hague, is married, and has a daughter.

References 

1974 births
21st-century Dutch politicians
Currency traders
Businesspeople from Amsterdam
Forum for Democracy (Netherlands) politicians
Living people
JA21 politicians
Members of the Senate (Netherlands)
Politicians from Amsterdam
Dutch bankers